Jaakan (Anglicized, já-a-kan), meaning "he twists", is a Hebrew name. In the Hebrew Bible, Jaakan is one of the sons of Ezer, the son of Seir the Horite (1 Chronicles 1:42).

References

Book of Genesis people